A boutique investment bank is a investment bank that specializes in at least one aspect of investment banking, generally corporate finance, although some banks' strengths are retail in nature, such as Charles Schwab. Of those involved in corporate finance, capital raising, mergers and acquisitions and restructuring and reorganizations are their primary activities.

Boutique investment banks generally work on smaller deals involving middle-market companies, and usually assist on the sell or buy-side in mergers and acquisitions transactions. In addition, they often specialize in certain industries such as media, healthcare, industrials, technology or energy. Some banks may specialize in certain types of transactions, such as capital raising or mergers and acquisitions, or restructuring and reorganization. Typically, boutique investment may have a limited number of offices and may specialize in certain geographic regions, thus the moniker, 'regional investment bank'. Traditionally, boutique investment banks are specialized in certain fields of corporate finance and thus not full-service. However, the term is often also used for non-bulge bracket full-service investment banks, banks that also are knows as middle-market investment banks.

History
During 2014, The Financial Times The New York Times, and The Economist all published favorable articles regarding the growing trend of corporations to hire boutique investment banks.  Reasons cited included their absence of conflicts, independence, and skill of one or a relative few individuals. The discrediting of traditionally conflicted Wall Street investment banking firms, especially those listed as full-service or conglomerates on the list of investment banks, due to their role in the creation or exacerbation of the Great Financial Crisis is cited as a primary reason for the ascendancy of these boutique firms. However, advances in technology which permit the outsourcing of all non-core aspects of the firm have also been cited as a cause of this David versus Goliath phenomenon.

Working at boutique investment banks generally requires working fewer hours than at larger banks, even though the majority of boutiques are founded and led by former partners at large banks.

As larger investment banks were hit hard by the Great Recession of the 2000s, many senior bankers left to join boutiques, some of which largely resemble the partnerships that ruled Wall Street in the 1970s and 1980s. Boutique investment banks took a greater share of the M&A and advising market at the same time.

Large, prestigious boutique firms include Evercore, Lazard, Centerview Partners, PJT Partners and Moelis & Company. While these may be full-service and international in scale, they are significantly smaller than and do not offer the breadth of products and services of bulge bracket investment banks.

Services 
Boutique investment banks may be engaged in providing one or more of the following services:

 Connecting clients, especially with regard to IPOs or further stock offerings.
 Mergers and Acquisitions advisory
 Underwriting debt and/or equity securities
 Capital raising (e.g. private equity deals; not as common due to small firm size)

Notable boutique investment banks 
There are many boutique investment banks, some of which are well known within their field. The following is a partial list of notable boutique investment banks:

 Allen & Company
 Berkery, Noyes & Co
 BG Capital
 C.W. Downer
 Cantor Fitzgerald
 Capstone Partners
 Centerview Partners
 CSG Partners
 Ducera Partners
 Financo
 Foros
 Gleacher & Company
 Grannenfelt Finance
 Guggenheim Partners
 Invesco PowerShares
 Keefe, Bruyette, & Woods
 Ladenburg Thalmann
 Lazard
 Lincoln International
 Marathon Capital
 Marlin & Associates
 McColl Partners
 Miller Buckfire & Co.
 Morgan Keegan & Co.
 Needham & Co.
 Panmure Gordon
 Roth Capital Partners
 Stephens, Inc.
 Stifel Financial
 Van Lanschot Kempen
 WR Hambrecht + Co

See also 
 Bulge Bracket investment banks
 Middle Market investment banks
 List of largest investment banks
 List of hedge funds
 List of private-equity firms
 Fund of funds
 Sovereign wealth fund
Boutique law firm

References

Investment banking